Chen Jian is the name of:

Chen Jian (diplomat) (born 1942), Chinese diplomat
Chen Jian (politician) (born 1952), Chinese politician who served as vice minister of Commerce from 2008 to 2013.
Chen Jian (born 1961) (born 1961), Chinese politician who served as party secretary of Dali Bai Autonomous Prefecture from 2017 to 2021.
Chen Jian (academic), professor of Chinese history and international relations at Cornell University